Jean Ballantyne (10 July 1906 – 17 November 1980) was a New Zealand ballet teacher and examiner, choreographer. She was born in Hastings, Hawke's Bay, New Zealand on 10 July 1906.

References

1906 births
1980 deaths
New Zealand ballerinas
New Zealand choreographers
People from Hastings, New Zealand
20th-century New Zealand dancers
20th-century New Zealand educators